The John Wade House is a historic house located in Medford, Massachusetts. It is locally significant as one of only two surviving early Cape style houses in the city.

Description and history 
The -story, timber-framed house has a side gable roof, a large central chimney, and a solid granite foundation. The main facade is five bays wide, with a center entrance flanked by sidelight windows and pilasters. An ell and sunporch extend to the rear of the original main block. The house was built around 1784 by John Wade, a tanner. A later owner added the Greek Revival entrance surround

The house was listed on the National Register of Historic Places on June 18, 1975. It is sometimes referred to locally as the "Pierce Tavern", although it was never used as such, and probably stood next door to a tavern.

See also
National Register of Historic Places listings in Medford, Massachusetts
National Register of Historic Places listings in Middlesex County, Massachusetts

References

Houses on the National Register of Historic Places in Medford, Massachusetts
Houses in Medford, Massachusetts
Houses completed in 1784